Scopula perialurga is a moth of the  family Geometridae. It is found in Australia (including New South Wales).

References

Moths described in 1922
perialurga
Moths of Australia